Radical People's Party may refer to one of the following political parties:

Free-minded People's Party (Germany) of Germany, also translated as Radical People's Party
Radical People's Party (Finland)
Radical People's Party (Norway)